Ishad was an Old Turkic word used to designate the highest-ranking Göktürk generals (e.g., Buri-sad). It is also used in some Arabic sources to describe the Khagan Bek of the Khazars. Brook (2006:261), citing Golden (1980), proposes that Ishad is a variant of Shad, a Turkic title of Iranian origin.

References
Kevin Alan Brook. The Jews of Khazaria. 2nd ed. Rowman & Littlefield Publishers, Inc, 2006.
Douglas M. Dunlop. The History of the Jewish Khazars, Princeton, N.J.: Princeton University Press, 1954.
Peter B. Golden. Khazar Studies: An Historio-Philological Inquiry into the Origins of the Khazars. Budapest: Akademia Kiado, 1980.
Norman Golb and Omeljan Pritsak, Khazarian Hebrew Documents of the Tenth Century. Ithaca: Cornell Univ. Press, 1982.

Khazar titles
Titles of the Göktürks